Tartaruga may refer to:

Biology
The term Tartaruga is a word in Italian, Portuguese and Galician that may refer to:

 Testudines, including:
 Turtle, an aquatic reptile
 Tortoise, a land-dwelling reptile

Places
 Praia da Tartaruga / Tartaruga Beach in Rio das Ostras

Other
 Tartaruga, nickname for FS Class E.444 locomotives